Berenberg Verlag is a German publishing company in Berlin, founded in 2004 by Heinrich von Berenberg-Gossler, a member of the Berenberg-Gossler banking dynasty and son of the banker, Baron Heinrich von Berenberg-Gossler. It publishes biographical literature, essays, memoirs and poetry. In March 2015, the publishing house received the Kurt Wolff Foundation Prize, worth 26,000 euros. In September 2019, the publishing house was awarded the German Publishing Prize.

References

External links

Book publishing companies of Germany
Berenberg-Gossler family
Mass media in Berlin
2004 establishments in Germany